The 2015 RideLondon–Surrey Classic (also known as the 2015 Prudential RideLondon–Surrey Classic for sponsorship reasons) was the 3rd running of the RideLondon–Surrey Classic one-day cycling race. It was held on 2 August 2015 as a 1.HC category event within the 2015 UCI Europe Tour.

The race was won by  rider Jempy Drucker in a sprint finish from the remnants of a breakaway group. Mike Teunissen of  finished second.

Results

References

External links 
 

2015 UCI Europe Tour
2015 in British sport
2015
2015 in English sport
August 2015 sports events in the United Kingdom